Dyenna Union is a union of Tangail Sadar Upazila, Tangail District, Bangladesh. It is situated 5 km west of Tangail, The District Headquarter.

Demographics

According to Population Census 2011 performed by Bangladesh Bureau of Statistics, The total population of Dyenna union is 31440. There are 7283 households in total.

Education

The literacy rate of Dyenna Union is 47.7% (Male-52.5%, Female-43.2%).

See also
 Union Councils of Tangail District

References

Populated places in Dhaka Division
Populated places in Tangail District
Unions of Tangail Sadar Upazila